Domesticine is an α1D-adrenergic receptor antagonist.

References

Alpha-1 blockers